"Handsome and Wealthy" is a song by American hip hop group Migos. It was released as a single on September 23, 2014 by Quality Control Entertainment and 300 Entertainment. The song was included on their mixtape No Label 2 (2014) and was produced by Cheeze Beatz.

Commercial performance
The song peaked at number 79 on the US Billboard Hot 100 chart in November 2014.

Music video 
The music video for "Handsome And Wealthy" was released on September 9, 2014.

Charts

Weekly charts

Year-end charts

Certifications

References

External links 

2014 singles
2014 songs
Migos songs
300 Entertainment singles
Songs written by Quavo
Songs written by Offset (rapper)
Songs written by Takeoff (rapper)